Ko Hyung-jin (고형진; born 20 June 1982) is a South Korean football referee. He has been a full international referee for FIFA.  He also mistakenly didn't accept Amir Arsalan Motahari of Esteghlal goal to AlAhli FC at 2020 AFC Champions League.

AFC Asian Cup

References 

1982 births
Living people
South Korean football referees
AFC Asian Cup referees